Wadsworth Chapel, also known as the Catholic-Protestant Chapels, is actually two separate chapels under one roof on the campus of the Dept. of Veterans Affairs Medical Center in West Los Angeles, California.  The structure was built in 1900 and was closed in 1971 after being damaged in the 1971 Sylmar earthquake.  It is the oldest building on Wilshire Boulevard and was listed in the National Register of Historic Places in 1972.  The structure has fallen into a state of disrepair due to the lack of funds within the Dept. of Veterans Affairs to pay for the required repairs and renovation.

Early history

The  Dept. of Veterans Affairs Medical Center in West Los Angeles was deeded to the federal government in 1888 to build the Pacific Branch of the National Home for Disabled Volunteer Soldiers.  A series of Victorian dormitories were built in the 1890s, and Wadsworth Chapel was built in 1900 to provide a place of worship for the residents of the old soldiers’ home.

Architecture

The building actually contains two separate chapels separated by a double brick wall, with a Catholic chapel at the north end and a Protestant chapel at the south end.  Each chapel has a separate entrance, with a tower and belfry.  Designed by J. Lee Burton, Wadsworth Chapel  had been called an "intricate little jewel box" by Christopher Alexander, the associate curator of architecture for the Getty Research Institute.

The building is noted for its eclectic exterior ornamentation and its combination of Colonial Revival (sometimes classified as Romanesque Revival) and Carpenter Gothic Victorian architecture.  The Los Angeles Cultural Heritage Board has described the Wadsworth Chapel and other original buildings on the Veterans campus as "the most monumental complex of Shingle-style Queen Anne structures ever constructed in the Los Angeles area."  The  building was built at a cost of $12,400 in 1900 with redwood siding and 21 different types of windows.

Though the exterior has been painted all white since 1941, the exterior was originally stained in dark earth tones, with white trim, as shown in old postcards of the chapel.  The Protestant chapel was damaged by fire in 1955.  The VA lacked funds to repair all of the fire damage, and the balcony of the Protestant chapel has been closed since that time.

Deterioration and renovation proposals

Both chapels have been closed to the public since the 1971 Sylmar earthquake loosened the foundation and caused the northeast bell tower to pull away from a gable.  Since 1971, the building has fallen into an ever-worsening state of disrepair, as the VA has been unable to fund necessary repair and restoration work.  Despite its neglect for more than 35 years, preservation experts note that the building, the oldest remaining building on Wilshire Boulevard, is a prime candidate for “architectural resurrection.”  The VA has estimated the cost of renovation to be $11.5 million, with the required work including replacement of the masonry foundation, seismic retrofit and asbestos and lead paint removal.

The expenditure of large sums to renovate the chapel has become a subject of controversy within the veteran community.  With the VA lacking funds to provide necessary services to veterans of the Iraq War, many object to spending nearly $12 million to renovate a chapel that has been mothballed since 1972.  In a 2007 Los Angeles Times article, one veteran reflected ambivalence about the proposed renovation: “That is such a beautiful piece of workmanship and, yes, it cries out  to be repaired.....  At the same time, the veterans cry out to be repaired.  It’s a moral issue.” Efforts by the Veterans Park Conservancy to raise private funds to pay for the renovation had been unsuccessful as of 2007.  The Times noted: “The oldest building on Wilshire Boulevard is a fixerupper duplex of a most unusual sort.”

See also
 List of Registered Historic Places in Los Angeles
 Streetcar Depot, West Los Angeles

References

External links
 Wadsworth Chapel preservation web site
 West Los Angeles Veterans Affairs Old Soldiers Home website

Churches in Los Angeles
Roman Catholic churches in California
Chapels in the United States
Sawtelle, Los Angeles
Wilshire Boulevard
Roman Catholic churches completed in 1900
History of Los Angeles
Properties of religious function on the National Register of Historic Places in Los Angeles
Towers completed in 1900
Towers in California
Bell towers in the United States
Carpenter Gothic church buildings in California
Shingle Style church buildings
Romanesque Revival church buildings in California
Victorian architecture in California
Chapels in Los Angeles
Roman Catholic chapels in the United States
Shingle Style architecture in California
20th-century Roman Catholic church buildings in the United States